Air Commodore Keith Logan "Grid" Caldwell CBE, MC, DFC & Bar (16 October 1895 – 28 November 1980) was a New Zealand fighter ace of the Royal Flying Corps in World War I who also rose to the rank of Air Commodore in the Royal New Zealand Air Force during World War II.

Early life
Born in Wellington on 16 October 1895, Keith Logan Caldwell was the son of David Robert Caldwell and his wife Mary Dunlop . His parents moved the family to Auckland when Caldwell was a child and he was educated at King's College and Wanganui Collegiate School. Interested in the military, he served in the Defence Cadet Corps while still at school. On completing his education, he worked as a bank clerk.

First World War

On the outbreak of hostilities in August 1914, Caldwell attempted to enlist in the New Zealand Expeditionary Force, raised for service in the war, but was declined. He paid £100 to join the first class at the New Zealand Flying School, run by brothers Vivian and Leo Walsh, in October 1915, where he learned to fly on the Walsh Brothers Flying Boats. He referred to aircraft as "grids", or bicycles, a habit which earned him his nickname. A quick learner, he soloed on 28 November. However, bad weather meant he was not able to complete the Royal Aero Club tests required to graduate. 

Despite this Caldwell sailed for England in January 1916. He carried with him a letter from the Walsh brothers attesting to his flying competency. He was subsequently commissioned into the Royal Flying Corps. He was trained at Oxford, Norwich and Sedgeford. On 29 July he was posted to No. 8 Squadron, which operated Royal Aircraft Factory B.E.2s on observation duty near Arras. He flew extensively throughout the next four months and had at least seven encounters with German aircraft during this time. In one of these, on 18 September, he and his observer shot down a Roland C.II.

No. 60 Squadron RFC
Towards the end of 1916, Caldwell was transferred to No. 60 Squadron, which flew Nieuport 17 fighters. By February 1917 he was a flight commander in the squadron, having been promoted to captain. By September when the unit converted to Royal Aircraft Factory S.E.5s Caldwell had scored further victories, all against Albatros scout aircraft. He received the Military Cross on 17 September, by which time he had added his first victory in an S.E.5. The citation, published in The London Gazette, read:  

In October 1917 he was posted back to England as an instructor.

No. 74 Squadron RAF

In February 1918 Caldwell was elevated to the rank of major and appointed commander of No. 74 Squadron, which was equipped with the S.E.5. He took the squadron to France the following month,  and, based at Clairmarais, it flew its first sortie on 12 April. 

Caldwell was awarded the Distinguished Flying Cross in December, the citation being "A fine fighting airman of courage and determination. On 4th September, when on offensive patrol, he, in company with another machine, attacked four Fokker biplanes; one of these was driven down by this officer. He has accounted for five enemy machines."

Although never shot down, he once survived a mid air collision with another pilot of No. 74 Squadron, Sydney Carlin, nursing his crippled aircraft to ground level before climbing out of the cockpit and jumping clear as it crashed. Caldwell fought inconclusive dogfights with German flying aces Werner Voss and Hermann Becker. A natural pilot with excellent eyesight and a talent for finding enemy aircraft, Caldwell's weakness was that, as a poor shot, he frequently was unable to destroy the aircraft he engaged—a flaw that stopped him joining the ranks of top Allied aces in which he moved. 

One of the squadron's flight commanders was flying ace Mick Mannock, and Caldwell thought highly of his tactical skills when engaging opposing aircraft. He also criticised Mannock; after the Briton killed two German airmen who had crash landed behind Allied lines, wrote: "The Hun crashed but not badly, and most people would have been content with this—but not Mick Mannock. He dived half a dozen times at the machine, spraying bullets at the pilot and observer, who were still showing signs of life...On being questioned as to his wild behaviour after we had landed, he heatedly replied, 'The swines are better dead—no prisoners for me!'".

Under Caldwell's command, No. 74 Squadron claimed a creditable 140 aircraft destroyed and 85 'out of control' for a modest 15 pilots killed or prisoner. Caldwell fought his last combat on 30 October, claiming a Fokker D.VII fighter, his ninth aerial victory over this type of aircraft. Altogether he is credited with 11 aircraft destroyed, 2 shared destroyed, 1 shared captured, and 10 and 1 shared 'out of control'.

Interwar period
Transferred to the Unemployed List of the RAF on 17 July 1919, Caldwell returned to New Zealand in August 1919. After a year working for his father he bought a farm at Glen Murray in the Waikato. On 16 May 1923 he married Dorothy Helen Gordon, the sister of fellow flying ace Frederick Stanley Gordon, and had two daughters and two sons.

Caldwell maintained his interest in aviation, being a founding member and first club captain of the Auckland Aero Club. In 1924, when the part-time New Zealand Air Force was formed alongside the New Zealand Permanent Air Force (PAF), Caldwell was the senior officer of the original 72 personnel, all of whom were ex-RAF pilots. The part-time force evolved into the Territorial Air Force (TAF) in 1930, and Caldwell, now holding the rank of wing commander, was its leader. His command consisted of four squadrons; two for army co-operation duties and two bomber units. However, the TAF lacked its own aircraft and relied on the PAF, soon to be renamed the Royal New Zealand Air Force, for equipment and groundcrew. In 1935, he was awarded the King George V Silver Jubilee Medal.

Second World War
During the Second World War he served in the RNZAF, as station commander at Woodbourne near Blenheim and later Wigram at Christchurch, before being posted to India in 1944 and England in 1945, where he was promoted to acting Air Commodore, achieving full rank in 1946. Caldwell was made a Commander of the Most Excellent Order of the British Empire (CBE) in the 1945 New Year Honours. He was awarded a bar to his DFC, and in addition to his MC was twice mentioned in despatches and received the Croix de Guerre from Belgium.

Later life
Caldwell retired from the RNZAF in 1956 and took up farming in South Auckland. He retained an interest in military aviation and in 1960, along with Ronald Bannerman and Leonard Isitt, established the New Zealand 1914–1918 Airmen's Association. Members of the organisation met annually to reminiscence about their wartime experiences. Retiring to live in Auckland in 1970, he died of cancer there on 28 November 1980.

Notes

References

External links
NZ History Biography.
TV3 Article, Video.
Dictionary of New Zealand Biography
Keith Logan "Grid" CALDWELL CBE, MC, DFC and Bar , ED, mid, Croix de Guerre (Belgium) 
Keith Caldwell

1895 births
1980 deaths
British Army personnel of World War I
British World War I flying aces
New Zealand Commanders of the Order of the British Empire
New Zealand military personnel of World War II
New Zealand World War I flying aces
People educated at King's College, Auckland
People educated at Whanganui Collegiate School
Recipients of the Croix de guerre (Belgium)
Recipients of the Distinguished Flying Cross (United Kingdom)
New Zealand recipients of the Military Cross
Royal Air Force officers
Royal Air Force personnel of World War I
Royal Flying Corps officers
Royal New Zealand Air Force personnel